WWCT is an FM broadcasting station licensed to Bartonville, Illinois.  Through most of its history, the WWCT callsign was associated with Peoria's 105.7 frequency allocation; the call sign and related format was moved to 96.5 (Farmington) in 2003, then 99.9 (Bartonville) in 2006.  The original 99.9 callsign, WIXO, and its music format, had moved to 105.7 in 2006.

History

105.7

The original 105.7 was operating as WWTO in the early 1970s.  In 1976, the station changed its callsign to WWCT and made its debut as an album rock station.    Calling itself simply "106" or "WWCT" early on, by the 1990s, it was using the nickname "Rock 106". Locally owned until the 1990s, the station was then sold to AAA Entertainment.  AAA gave the station the new nickname "Rock 105.7", then "Rock 96.5" when it moved the format to the Farmington-licensed frequency.

96.5

WWCT was moved to 96.5 in 2003 by AAA to make room for its new WXMP "Mix 105.7" on the more powerful signal.  In January 2006, WWCT switched to an all-request Rock format, which it maintained until it was shut down on September 20, 2006 after being sold to Independence Media.  Independence Media flipped the format to Top 40/CHR, named "98.5 Kiss FM", and launched a simulcast on 96.5 (changed to WRIA) and also on 98.5 (WPIA), which had been Christian music station "Hope 98.5".  96.5 is now WHPI, a simulcast of sister station WPIA.

99.9
What is now WWCT signed on August 2, 1996 as WIXO, originally stunting with loops of "Macarena" by Los Del Rio. On February 21, 1997 at 6 p.m., the station flipped to an alternative rock format as "99X". The WIXO call letters would move to 105.7 FM in September 2006.

Independence Media, who had also bought the license for 99.9, replaced its 10-day-old callsign WRXP with the current callsign WWCT on September 29, 2006, but kept the nickname 99.9 Pirate Radio.

On or around Sunday, April 8, 2007, the Pirate Radio moniker was dropped in favor of CT 99-dot-9.  The slogan was changed to "World Class Rock" and the size of the playlist increased greatly, cutting a wide swath across many different genres and eras of music.  On April 11, 2008, the station temporarily dropped the adult album alternative format it had been running with the slogan "World Class Rock" and began stunting; it then returned on April 15 with the new name 99.9 The Stage.

 
On September 15, 2008, after three days of stunting, the station became alternative rock station 99.9 The Buzz, and began carrying the Lex and Terry morning show from KEGL in Dallas.  The station was commercial-free from 10 a.m. to Noon.

The station was turned over to Michael S. Rea through Advanced Media Partners on August 1, 2010, in anticipation of the station being purchased; since then, the station has run a format of mixed popular music. On September 26, the station flipped back to adult album alternative after many weeks of stunting. The sale of WWCT, along with its other three Peoria-area stations (WZPN, WPIA, and WHPI), was completed on November 15.

On or around November 1, 2020, WWCT rebranded as CT 99.9, and adopted the slogan "Listen Different".

References

External links

Radio stations established in 1996
WCT